Harsh Narayan is an Indian sarangi player based in Mumbai, India.

Narayan is a grandson and disciple of sarangi player Ram Narayan. His father is the sarod player Brij Narayan. Narayan performed with Ram Narayan at the 57th Sawai Gandharva music festival.

In 2016, Times Music released his first solo album entitled Scintillating Sarangi featuring the ragas Puriya Dhanashree and Patdeep.

Discography 
Scintillating Sarangi (2016, Times Music)
Dhanurvadya (2020, Tala Records) with Ty Burhoe

References

External links 

1985 births
Living people
Musicians from Mumbai
Sarangi players